The Public Service Announcement Tour was a reunion tour by American rock band Rage Against the Machine, which began on July 9, 2022, at Alpine Valley Music Theatre in East Troy, Wisconsin and concluded early on August 14, 2022, at Madison Square Garden in New York City. This tour marks the band's first live appearances in eleven years, and their first full-length tour in 22 years, after they completed the accompanying tour for its third album The Battle of Los Angeles.

The tour was originally scheduled to start in North America in March 2020, followed by a series of European festival appearances, but it was pushed back to the summer of 2021, then to 2022 and again to 2023, due to the COVID-19 pandemic before many of the dates were cancelled.

Background
On November 1, 2019, it was reported that Rage Against the Machine were reuniting for their first shows in nine years in the spring of 2020, including two appearances at that year's Coachella Valley Music and Arts Festival.

On February 10, 2020, the band announced the dates and venues for their 2020 world tour. The tour was going to begin with a North American leg in March, but it was repeatedly postponed, first to July and then to June 2021, due to the onset of the COVID-19 pandemic.

On May 1, 2020, Rage Against the Machine announced on its official website that, due to circumstances influenced by the ongoing pandemic, all the tour dates that were scheduled to take place that year had been postponed to 2021:

Initially, however, the band was still scheduled to perform at 2020's Coachella Valley Music and Arts Festival, which had been pushed back from April to October before it was officially canceled for similar reasons as the tour postponement.

On April 8, 2021, it was announced that the "Public Service Announcement" Tour had once again been rescheduled to the spring and summer of 2022.

On July 11, during the tour's second show in Chicago, De La Rocha injured his leg during the fourth song of the evening. He performed the rest of the show sitting on a speaker, and remained seated for all subsequent North American performances, being assisted on and off stage. On August 11, it was announced that the European leg of the tour had been cancelled, as De La Rocha had been advised to rest as to allow for proper healing. Then almost 2 months later on October 4th, via a statement on the band's official Instagram account, De La Rocha announced they had made the difficult decision to cancel all remaining stops on the tour, including the 2023 North American leg, due to the severity of his injury.

Setlist
The following set list is from the July 12 concert in Chicago. It is not intended to represent all dates throughout the tour.

"Bombtrack"
"People of the Sun"
"Bulls on Parade"
"Bullet in the Head"
"Revolver" 
"Testify" 
"Tire Me"
"Take The Power Back"
"Close Your Eyes (And Count to Fuck)" (w/ Run the Jewels) 
 "Wake Up"
"Guerrilla Radio"
"Down Rodeo"
"Without a Face"
 "Know Your Enemy"
"Calm Like a Bomb"
"Sleep Now in the Fire"
 "No Shelter"
 "War Within a Breath" 
 "The Ghost of Tom Joad"
 "Snakecharmer" 
 "Township Rebellion" 
"Freedom" 
"Killing in the Name"

Tour dates

Cancelled dates

Notes

References

Rage Against the Machine concert tours
2022 concert tours
Reunion concert tours
Concert tours postponed due to the COVID-19 pandemic